A Honeybee Heart Has Five Openings is a 2018 memoir by Helen Jukes.

The memoir details Juke's decision to reinvent herself as a beekeeper after feeling rootless. Portions of the memoir were originally published in The Junket as essays on beekeeping.

Summary
While living in London Jukes develops a friendship with a beekeeper. She later moves to Oxford for a demanding job and feels miserable. Jukes begins to contemplate keeping her own bees. After she mentions this to friends they come together during Christmas to buy her her own hive.

Reception
The memoir drew wide praise for both its unique subject matter and Jukes' observant writing. The Guardian said the memoir "moved and delighted".

References 

British memoirs
Bees in popular culture
2018 non-fiction books
Simon & Schuster books